Estonia competed at the 2022 Winter Olympics in Beijing, China, from 4 to 20 February 2022. Estonian team consisted of 26 athletes.

Martin Himma and Kelly Sildaru were the country's flagbearer during the opening ceremony. Sildaru was also the flagbearer during the closing ceremony.

Kelly Sildaru won bronze in Women's slopestyle bringing Estonia the first medal on 2022 Winter Olympics and became Estonia's first Winter Olympic medalist since the Vancouver 2010.

Medalists

Competitors
The following is a list of the number of competitors participating at the Games per sport/discipline.

Alpine skiing

By meeting the basic qualification standards Estonia qualified one male and one female alpine skier.

Biathlon

Estonia qualified four male and four female biathletes.

Men

Women

Mixed

Cross-country skiing

Estonia qualified four male and five female cross-country skiers.

Distance

Sprint
Men

Women

Figure skating

In the 2021 World Figure Skating Championships in Stockholm, Sweden, Estonia secured one quota in both the men's and ladies singles competitions.

Singles

Freestyle skiing 

Kelly Sildaru is Estonia's qualifier in both Halfpipe and Slopestyle/Big Air.

Halfpipe

Slopestyle and Big air

Nordic combined 

Estonia qualified one athlete.

Ski jumping 

Estonia qualified two male ski jumpers.

Speed skating

Estonian speed skater Marten Liiv qualified in both 500 and 1000 metres event.

References

Nations at the 2022 Winter Olympics
2022
Winter Olympics